Minister of State for Social Care may refer to:

 Minister of State for Social Care (UK)
 Secretary of State for Health and Social Care